The Nursing Spectrum is "a group of biweekly periodicals" that, in 1994, was acquired by Gannett. Both Gannett and the magazines continued, albeit with more than one parent corporation renaming.

History
The periodical family was founded in 1987, acquired by Gannett in 1995, and became "12 regional nursing publications" by 2006.

References

External links
 
 nursing-related reading: NYTimes

Magazines established in 1987
Medical magazines
Professional and trade magazines